Wojciech "Wojtek" Kowalski (born 10 October 1967 in Inowrocław) is a former tennis player from Poland.

Career

Kowalski represented his native country as a qualifier at the 1988 Summer Olympics in Seoul. There he was defeated in the first round by fellow qualifier Tony Mmoh from Nigeria. 

He played mostly on the Challenger tour level and reached four singles finals and winning one title. The right-hander reached his highest singles ATP-ranking on 25 July 1988, when he became the number 109 of the world.

He is married to Klaudia Kowalski and has two sons, Jonas and Moritz. Right now he is working as a tennis coach for TB Erlangen in his own tennis school Tennisschule Kowalski.

ATP Challenger and ITF Futures finals

Singles: 2 (1–1)

Doubles: 1 (1–0)

Performance timeline

Singles

References

External links
 
 

1967 births
Living people
Polish male tennis players
Olympic tennis players of Poland
Tennis players at the 1988 Summer Olympics
People from Inowrocław
Sportspeople from Kuyavian-Pomeranian Voivodeship